State Road 289 (NM 289) is a  state highway in the US state of New Mexico. NM 289's southern terminus is at NM 288 north of Clovis, and the northern terminus is at NM 209 south of Broadview.

Major intersections

See also

References

289
Transportation in Curry County, New Mexico